Ruby Bentall (born 3 April 1988) is an English actress, known for playing Minnie in Lark Rise to Candleford, Mary Bennet in Lost in Austen, and Verity Poldark in the 2015 BBC adaptation of Winston Graham's Poldark novels.

Background
Bentall was born at home in Camden, London. She is the daughter of actors Janine Duvitski and Paul Bentall. The family moved to Petersham outside Richmond when Bentall was eight. She attended Grey Court School and went to Richmond upon Thames College between 2004 and 2006, graduating with a BTEC National Diploma in Performance.

Bentall has three siblings, and two elder half-siblings from her father's first marriage. She currently lives in London. Her younger sister Edith is the lead singer of the band 'FOURS'.

Career
Bentall's first professional acting job was an episode of Holby City, which she filmed in 2006 while still at Richmond College. Her other television credits include You Can Choose Your Friends, Doctors, Oliver Twist (2007) and New Tricks. She played Mary Bennet in the 2008 mini-series Lost in Austen, a performance described as "by far the most interesting interpretation of the sanctimonious middle Bennet daughter of Pride and Prejudice yet". In 2009 she joined the regular cast of Lark Rise to Candleford, playing Minnie.

Bentall made her stage debut at the National Theatre in 2008, appearing in productions of DNA and The Miracle. She has also lent her voice to the BBC Radio 4 drama Sister Agnes Investigates. She played Alice in Alice, an adaptation of Lewis Carroll's Alice in Wonderland, written by Laura Wade, at the Sheffield Crucible in June 2010. She played Anya in Remembrance Day at the Royal Court Theatre in March - April 2011 and the role of Victoria in the Mike Leigh directed play Grief at the Royal National Theatre in London. 
In January 2014, she starred as Julie in a stage adaptation of The Cement Garden in London at The Vaults, Waterloo.

On 30 March 2014, it was announced that Bentall would be playing Ross Poldark's cousin Verity in the new BBC One version of Poldark, broadcast in 2015. Bentall made a guest appearance in Holby City in July 2018.

Filmography

Film

Television

References

External links
 

English people of Polish descent
People from Camden Town
Actresses from London
English television actresses
English film actresses
English stage actresses
English radio actresses
1988 births
Living people
21st-century English actresses
Alumni of Richmond upon Thames College